Shashi Deshpande (born 1938) is an Indian novelist. She is a recipient of the Sahitya Akademi Award and the Padma Shri Award in 1990 and 2009 respectively.

Biography
She was born in Dharwad, Karnataka, the second daughter of the Kannada dramatist and writer Adya Rangacharya and Sharada Adya. She was educated in Bombay (now Mumbai) and Bangalore. Deshpande has degrees in Economics and Law. In Mumbai, she studied journalism at the Vidya Bhavan and worked for a few months as a journalist for the magazine 'Onlooker'.

She published her first collection of short stories in 1978, and her first novel, 'The Dark Holds No Terror', in 1980. She won the Sahitya Akademi Award for the novel That Long Silence in 1990 and the Padma Shri award in 2009. Her novel Shadow Play was shortlisted for The Hindu Literary Prize in 2014.

Deshpande has written four children’s books, a number of short stories, thirteen novels, and an essay collection entitled Writing from the Margin and Other Essays.

On 9 October 2015, she resigned from her position in the Sahitya Akademi's general council and returned her Sahitya Akademi award. In doing so, she joined a broader protest by other writers against the Akademi's perceived inaction and silence on the murder of M. M. Kalburgi.

On 6 December 2018, during her inaugural address of the ninth edition of the Goa Arts and Literature Festival (GALF), Deshpande urged Indians to think about the consequences of wanting a Hindu nation, and reminded those present of the violence and carnage that had been caused by the India-Pakistan partition.

Selected bibliography
 The Dark Holds No Terrors, Penguin Books India (1980), 
 If I Die Today (1982)
 Come Up and Be Dead (1983)
 Roots and Shadows (1983)
 That Long Silence, Penguin (paperback 1989), 
 The Intrusion and Other Stories (1993)
 A Matter of Time, The Feminist Press at CUNY (1996), 
 The Binding Vine, The Feminist Press at CUNY (2002), 
 Small Remedies, Penguin India (2000), 
 Moving On, Penguin Books India (2004), 
 In the Country of Deceit, Penguin/Viking (2008), 
 Shadow Play, Aleph (2013), 
 Strangers to Ourselves, HarperCollins (2015), 

 Children's books
 A Summer Adventure
 The Hidden Treasure
 The Only Witness
 The Narayanpur Incident

Memoir 

 Listen to Me

Collected Essays 
 Writing from the Margin & Other Essays, Penguin (2003),

References

External links
 Feature on Women Writers, BBC World Service
 Review of 3 children's novels, The Hindu, 13 Oct 2006

1938 births
Indian women novelists
Novelists from Karnataka
Indian women children's writers
Indian children's writers
Living people
Recipients of the Sahitya Akademi Award in English
Recipients of the Padma Shri in literature & education
People from Dharwad
English-language writers from India
20th-century Indian novelists
Women writers from Karnataka
20th-century Indian women writers